Sebastian Earl (2 January 1900 – 10 April 1983) was a British rower who competed in the 1920 Summer Olympics.

Earl was born at Tonbridge Kent, the son of Alfred Earl and was educated at Oxford University. He was an accomplished rower and in 1920 he was a member of the Oxford crew in the Boat Race. Earl was also a member of the Leander eight which won the silver medal for Great Britain rowing at the 1920 Summer Olympics, coming within half a length of winning. He rowed for Oxford again in the Boat Race in 1921 and 1922. 
 
Earl married Hon. Edith Honor Maugham, daughter of Frederic Maugham, 1st Viscount Maugham and Helen Mary Romer, on 25 April 1925.

See also
List of Oxford University Boat Race crews

References

External links
profile

1900 births
1983 deaths
English male rowers
British male rowers
Olympic rowers of Great Britain
Rowers at the 1920 Summer Olympics
Olympic silver medallists for Great Britain
Olympic medalists in rowing
Alumni of the University of Oxford
Oxford University Boat Club rowers
Medalists at the 1920 Summer Olympics